The Red Curtain Trilogy is a DVD boxed set, released in 2002, of the first three films directed by Baz Luhrmann: 
 Strictly Ballroom (1992), starring Paul Mercurio and Tara Morice
 Romeo + Juliet (1996), starring Leonardo DiCaprio and Claire Danes
 Moulin Rouge! (2001), starring Nicole Kidman and Ewan McGregor

The films do not form a trilogy in the traditional sense, as there is no relationship between the plot and characters of the three films. Rather, Luhrmann said that the three films followed a specific style of filmmaking. Each film contains a theatre motif that reappears throughout the film. Dance is used in the first film, poetry and language in the second, and song in the third.

Reception

Box office performance

Critical response

References

Further reading

External links
 
 
 
 

20th Century Studios franchises
Australian film series
Trilogies